Sisymbriopsis is a genus of flowering plants in the crucifer family Brassicaceae, native to Central Asia and western China. They may have diversified due to mountain uplift.

Species
Currently accepted species include:

Sisymbriopsis mollipila (Maxim.) Botsch.
Sisymbriopsis pamirica (Y.Z.Lan & C.H.An) Al-Shehbaz, C.H.An & G.Yang
Sisymbriopsis schugnana Botsch. & Tzvelev
Sisymbriopsis shuanghuica (K.C.Kuan & C.H.An) Al-Shehbaz, C.H.An & G.Yang

References 

Brassicaceae
Brassicaceae genera
Taxa named by Victor Botchantsev